Goon Gumpas is a hill and a small settlement in west Cornwall, England, UK. Just to the south is the mining sett of the former Wheal Maid. It is in the civil parish of Gwennap. Aphex Twin, a Cornwall native, named a track from his Richard D. James Album after Goon Gumpas.

References

Villages in Cornwall